Fields is an unincorporated community in Beauregard Parish, Louisiana. United States.

Notable person
Gil Dozier, Louisiana politician, was born in Fields.

Notes

Unincorporated communities in Beauregard Parish, Louisiana
Unincorporated communities in Louisiana